Panchala Kingdom may refer to:
the historical Panchala kingdom
Panchala Kingdom (Mahabharata), a fictionalization of the historical kingdom in the Sanskrit epic